Rimosodaphnella tenuipurpurata is a species of sea snail, a marine gastropod mollusk in the family Raphitomidae.

Description
The length of the shell varies between 6 mm and 10 mm.

Distribution
This marine species occurs off Cebu Island, Cebu, Philippines

References

External links
 Bonfitto, A.; Morassi, M. (2013). New Indo-Pacific species of Rimosodaphnella Cossmann, 1916 (Gastropoda: Conoidea): a genus of probable Tethyan origin. Molluscan Research. 33(4): 230-236.
 Gastropods.com: Rimosodaphnella tenuipurpurata

tenuipurpurata
Gastropods described in 2013